The 1868 United States presidential election in Florida took place on November 3, 1868, as part of the 1868 United States presidential election. The state legislature chose three representatives, or electors to the Electoral College, who voted for president and vice president. The vote in the legislature was 40 Republicans to 9 Democrats.

Florida voted for the Republican nominee, Ulysses S. Grant.

As a result of the status of Reconstruction, the state's three electoral votes were allocated by the State Legislature to Grant. This was the only time in the state's history that the popular vote did not decide the election in the state.

Results

References

Florida
1868
1868 Florida elections